The CMLL International Gran Prix (2003) was a lucha libre, or professional wrestling, tournament produced and scripted by the Mexican professional wrestling promotion Consejo Mundial de Lucha Libre (CMLL; "World Wrestling Council" in Spanish) which took place on May 9, 2003 in Arena México, Mexico City, Mexico, CMLL's main venue. The 2003 International Gran Prix was the seventh time CMLL has held an International Gran Prix tournament since 1994. All International Gran Prix tournaments have been a one-night tournament, always as part of CMLL's Friday night CMLL Super Viernes shows.

The seventh International Gran Prix tournament was the second time where the format was as 16-man Tornero Cibernetico. This time the teams were "Team Mexico" (El Felino, Virus, Negro Casas, Mephisto, Averno, Blue Panther, Shocker and Dr. Wagner Jr.) and "Team Japan" (TARU, Don Fujii, Kazuhiko Masada, SUWA, Katsushi Takemura, Nosawa, CIMA and Último Dragón). The match came down to Último Dragón and Dr. Wagner Jr. and then saw Dr. Wagner Jr. win the Gran Prix for the "home team".

Production

Background
In 1994 the Mexican  professional wrestling promotion Consejo Mundial de Lucha Libre (CMLL) organized their first ever International Gran Prix tournament. The first tournament followed the standard "single elimination" format and featured sixteen wrestlers in total, eight representing Mexico and eight "international" wrestlers. In the end Mexican Rayo de Jalisco Jr. defeated King Haku in the finals to win the tournament. In 1995 CMLL brought the tournament back, creating an annual tournament held every year from 1995 through 1998 and then again in 2002, 2003 and finally from 2005 through 2008.

Storylines
The CMLL Gran Prix show  featured three professional wrestling matches scripted by CMLL with some wrestlers involved in scripted feuds. The wrestlers portray either heels (referred to as rudos in Mexico, those that play the part of the "bad guys") or faces (técnicos in Mexico, the "good guy" characters) as they perform.

Tournament

Tournament overview

Tournament show

References

2003 in professional wrestling
CMLL International Gran Prix
2003 in Mexico
May 2003 events in Mexico